Design and Technology (D&T) is a school subject offered at all levels of primary and secondary school in England. It is used so children develop a range of designing skills and technology skills for example, using media to design their project. It first appeared as a titled subject in the first National Curriculum of England, Wales and Northern Ireland in 1988.

D&T has been taught in many countries around the world such as India, United States, Australia, New Zealand, Ireland, Malta, China, South Africa, France and Finland. Many international schools teach design and technology. As a school subject it involves students in designing in a practical context using a range or materials and media. It is also a university course in many countries, including Australia, Canada, the US, Singapore, South Africa, Netherlands and New Zealand, both for the preparation of teachers and for general education in areas such as industrial design. Some of the UK universities which deliver courses include: Brighton, Sheffield Hallam, Goldsmiths, University of London and Greenwich.

Design and Technology qualifications

GCSE 
With the first National Curriculum new GCSE qualifications were introduced for D&T in England, Wales and Northern Ireland. Unlike the National Curriculum the previous subject titles were retained (e.g.  craft, design and technology  (CDT) and home economics) and others added (e.g. electronics, food technology, textiles technology and systems and control). These GCSE specifications had two assessed components:

 50% of the final mark for coursework
 50% for an examination of general subject knowledge (materials, processes, techniques and sustainability etc.).

GCSE D&T titles available included:

GCSE Design and Technology: Electronic Products
GCSE Design and Technology: Food Technology
GCSE Design and Technology: Graphic Products
GCSE Design and Technology: Resistant Materials
GCSE Design and Technology: Systems and Control
GCSE Design and Technology: Textiles Technology
GCSE Design and Technology: Product Design

GCSE D&T (2017 onwards) 
Since September 2017 a new GCSE has been taught in England that incorporates all material areas (with the exception of food which is now a separate GCSE).  Similar to the previous GCSE, the new  GCSE Specifications  have two assessed components - an exam and a non-examined assessment (NEA) but with a 50:50 split of the marks.

A level 
A and AS level examinations prepare students for individualised learning and problem solving, which is essential in business and industry. Time management is a key factor to candidates' success within the coursework elements of the qualification. The examinations are as rigorous as any other subject. Indeed, due to the complexity and variety of tasks and organisation skills required this examination and course is very demanding. The subject covers activities from control technology to aesthetic product design. Students have to use all types of computer software including computer-aided design and manufacture, spreadsheets and computer presentations.  Outputs from such work are often sent to CNC machines for manufacture.

International Baccalaureate 
IB Design Technology (DT) is an elective subject offered in many International Baccalaureate schools globally. Design is also offered in the IB Middle Years Programme as a compulsory subject for grades 6–10, and at the Diploma Programme level (grades 11-12). IB Design Technology is very similar in content to Design Technology, which is widely offered in the national curricula of England, Australia, Canada, New Zealand and many African nations. It is one of the Group 4 sciences.

The primary focus of MYP Design is to give students an understanding of the design cycle, through a practical programme. The student will complete projects based on solving a real and authentic problem. Students document their progress as they follow the design cycle to come to a feasible solution. They create the solution and then evaluate it following thorough testing.

The Diploma Programme of Design Technology is a two-year introduction to designing, a range of fundamentals of technology, and global technological issues. It provides students with the knowledge to be able to design and make in school workshops, and also to develop an informed literacy about technology in general. Because it is an international curriculum it has a particular focus on global environmental issues. It covers core topics in human factors and ergonomics, resource management and sustainable production, modeling, raw materials to final production,  innovation and design, classic design. It covers advanced higher level topics in user centered design, sustainability, innovation and markets, and commercial production. The diploma is accepted for university entrance in many countries, and is a good preparation for careers in areas such as engineering, architecture, product design, interior design, design and education.

Scotland 
Technological education is part of the Scottish secondary school curriculum. Technological education is segregated into various subjects available at National 4, National 5, Higher and Advanced Higher

Standard Subject in Technical
Graphic Communication
Design and Manufacture
Engineering Science
Practical Electronics (available to N5 level)
Practical Woodwork (available to N5 level)
Practical Metalwork (available to N5 level)

Specialist Subjects within Technical
Architectural technology
Automotive engineering
Civil engineering
Building services
Construction
Electrical engineering
Mechanical engineering
Mechatronics

Awards 
In the UK, the Arkwright Scholarships Trust awards two-year scholarships to students who are taking GCSE/Scottish Standard Grade in design & technology. The Arkwright Engineering Scholarships support students through their A levels/Scottish Highers and encourage them to study engineering or a related area of design at a top university or through a high-quality industrial apprenticeship.

See also
 Industrial arts, the equivalent course in the United States and Australia (Victoria).

References

Education in the United Kingdom
Education by subject
Industrial design